Aaron ben Mordecai HaLevi of Rödelheim was a German-Jewish translator, who flourished early in the eighteenth century.

Born in around 1695 in Rödelheim, Germany. In his early years, Rabbi Aaron studied in Frankfort, where he translated the two Targums on Esther into Yiddish. With the first edition, bearing the title Mezah Aharon, being published in 1718.

References

18th-century German writers
German translators
Jewish scholars
18th-century German rabbis
Writers from Frankfurt
18th-century scholars
German male non-fiction writers
18th-century German male writers
18th-century translators
Jewish translators
Jewish German writers
Translators to Yiddish